"Let Somebody Else Drive" is a song written by Merle Kilgore and Mack Vickery, and recorded by American country music artist John Anderson.  It was released in January 1984 as the second single from the album All the People Are Talkin'.  The song reached number 10 on the Billboard Hot Country Singles & Tracks chart.

Success
The song's success led to Anderson promoting public awareness of drinking and driving through the Florida State Highway Safety Department.

Anderson re-recorded the song for the 1996 compilation NFL Country, a multi-artist compilation album pairing country artists with players in the National Football League. This rendition featured guest vocals from Mike Young.

Content
The song is about the dangers of drinking and driving, warning those who drink to "let somebody else drive".

Other versions
The song was recorded by John Rich featuring Hank Williams Jr. on Rich's 2010 Extended play album Rich Rocks.

Chart performance

References

1984 singles
John Anderson (musician) songs
John Rich songs
Hank Williams Jr. songs
Songs written by Mack Vickery
Songs written by Merle Kilgore
Warner Records singles
1983 songs
Songs about driving under the influence
Harm reduction